Kenneth Maronie (born March 4, 1980) is a Dominican former swimmer, who specialized in sprint freestyle events. Maronie competed for Dominica in the men's 50 m freestyle at the 2000 Summer Olympics in Sydney. He received a ticket from FINA, under a Universality program, in an entry time of 26.96. He challenged seven other swimmers in heat two, including teenagers Khalid Al-Kulaibi of Oman (aged 14) and Sikhounxay Ounkhamphanyavong of Laos (aged 17). He faded down the stretch of the race to register a sixth-place time and a personal best of 26.85. Maronie failed to advance into the semifinals, as he placed sixty-seventh overall out of 80 swimmers in the prelims.

References

1980 births
Living people
People from Saint Paul Parish, Dominica
Dominica male freestyle swimmers
Olympic swimmers of Dominica
Swimmers at the 2000 Summer Olympics